Joshua Fagin, better known by his stage name Jay Fay, is an American DJ and producer from St. Louis, Missouri. He released his debut EP Bonkers in February 2012. He is best known for featuring on DJ Fresh's 2014 single "Dibby Dibby Sound", a track which was initially based on Jay Fay's solo single "Dibby Dibby".

Career

2012–present: Breakthrough
On 14 February 2012 he released his debut EP Bonkers. On 3 April 2012 he released his second EP $$ OOPS $$. In February 2014 he released the single "Dibby Dibby Sound" with DJ Fresh featuring vocals from English singer Ms. Dynamite. The song heavily samples Jay Fay's 2013 song "Dibby Dibby", featured on T&A Records' Moombahton Forever compilation album. Jay reworked the song with Fresh, and Ms. Dynamite's vocals were later added.

Discography

Extended plays

Singles

As featured artist

Other appearances

Remixes

References

Notes
A  "Dibby Dibby Sound" did not chart on the Ultratop's Belgian Wallonia Single's Chart, but it did chart at number 40 on the Ultratip chart, the top 50 songs which haven't made the Ultratop 50.

Sources

External links
 Jay Fay on Twitter
 Jay Fay on Facebook

Living people
American dance musicians
Musicians from St. Louis
Year of birth missing (living people)